Podlasek may refer to the following places:
Podlasek, Podlaskie Voivodeship (north-east Poland)
Podlasek, Świętokrzyskie Voivodeship (south-central Poland)
Podlasek, Warmian-Masurian Voivodeship (north Poland)